Kamil Bednář (4 July 1912 – 23 May 1972), also known by his pen name "Prokop Kouba", was a Czechoslovak poet, translator, prose writer, dramatist and publishing house editor.

Life
Bednář was born in Prague.  After 1931, he studied law, and then six years of philosophy in Charles University. After he finished his studies in 1939, he worked in the publishing house Melantrich, from 1949 in the publishing house Československý spisovatel. Since 1959 he dedicated himself only to the literature.

He was founder of the literary group Ohnice (jointed charlock) and Pevný bod as well as author of poems, prose writings, essays, fairy tales and numerous translations from different languages.  He died, aged 59, in Mělník.

Works

Books
 Kouzlení a cesty doktora Fausta
 O Faustovi, Markétce a ďáblu 
 Zuzanka a mořeplavci na Vltavě 
 Kamenný palác
 Veliký mrtvý

Translations
American poet Robinson Jeffers
Puss n Boots / The Cat in Boots Kocour v botách

German-language publications
Mr. Korbes
Swan lake
Small animals, large animals

References 

1912 births
1972 deaths
Czechoslovak poets
Czechoslovak writers
Czechoslovak translators
Charles University alumni